Honey flower is a common name for several plants and may refer to:
Lambertia formosa, a shrub from Australia
Melianthus comosus (honey flower), a shrub native to South Africa and Namibia
Melianthus major (giant honey flower), a shrub, endemic to South Africa and naturalised elsewhere
Protea mellifera